Kiri Nicole Baga (born April 15, 1995) is an American former figure skater. She won two gold medals on the ISU Junior Grand Prix series and placed 7th at the 2010 World Junior Championships. She is the 2010 U.S. junior pewter medalist and 2009 novice national champion.

Personal life
Kiri Baga was born as the youngest of five children in Detroit, Michigan. She was a student at Minnesota Connections Academy, an online school, and then studied psychology at Simmons College in Boston. In autumn 2014, she moved to the University of Pennsylvania. She is majoring in the biological basis of behavior.

Career
Baga began skating when she was two and a half. She began group lessons at age four, and private lessons shortly thereafter. Early in her career, she was coached by Sue Lien. She switched to Lorie Charbonneau when she was nine. Early in her career, she represented the Duluth Figure Skating Club. She changed club representation to the FSC of Bloomington in Bloomington, Minnesota following the 2005–2006 season.

In the 2005–2006 season, Baga began competing on the juvenile level. She placed 8th at her regional championship.

In the 2006–2007 season, Baga moved up to the Intermediate level. She won the bronze medal at her regional championship, qualifying her for the 2007 U.S. Junior Championships. At the Junior Championships, she placed 3rd in her qualifying group, 4th in the short program, and 10th in the free skating to place 8th overall.

Baga moved up to the novice level in the 2007–2008 season. She placed fifth at her regional championship and did not advance to her sectional championship She remained on the novice level for the 2008–2009 season. At her regional championship, she won the short program and placed third in the free skating to win the silver medal overall. At her sectional championship, she placed 5th in the short program and won the free skating to win the competition. This win qualifier her for the 2009 U.S. Figure Skating Championships. At the U.S. Championships, she won the short program and placed second in the free skating to win the gold medal overall.

Baga moved up to the Junior level for the 2009–2010 season. She made her international debut in the 2009–2010 ISU Junior Grand Prix. At her first event, in Germany, she won the short program and placed second in the free skating to win the competition overall. Following that win, she was assigned to the event in Turkey as her second event. At that event, she won the short program. Baga was the third qualifier to the 2009–2010 ISU Junior Grand Prix Final.

Baga was named the first alternate to the US ladies team to the 2010 World Junior Championships and was added to the team after Ashley Wagner withdrew. She debuted a new long program to Maksim Mrivca's "Hana's Eyes" and Piano Concerto in A minor by Edvard Grieg.

Baga made her comeback to competition by winning the 2011 Upper Great Lakes Regional Championships.

On March 23, 2012, it was announced that Baga had teamed up with Taylor Toth to compete in senior pair skating, while continuing her singles career. In May 2014, she said she would no longer train for elite competition, deciding to focus on her education.

Programs

Competitive highlights

Single skating

Pair skating with Toth

References

External links

 
 
 Kiri Baga at IceNetwork
 

American female single skaters
Figure skaters from Detroit
People from Bloomington, Minnesota
1995 births
Living people
21st-century American women